Advent songs are songs and hymns intended for Advent, the four weeks of preparation for Christmas. Topics of the time of expectation are the hope for a Messiah, prophecies, and the symbolism of light, among others. Several of the songs are part of hymnals such as the German Catholic Gotteslob (GL) and the Protestant Evangelisches Gesangbuch (EG).

This is a dynamic list and may never be able to satisfy particular standards for completeness.

4th century 

 Veni redemptor gentium

6th century 

 O Antiphons
 Vox clara ecce intonat

12th century 

 Veni, veni, Emmanuel (the most common setting in the Anglophone world dates to the 19th century)

13th century 

 Angelus ad virginem
 Gabriel's Message

14th century 
 Sei uns willkommen, Herre Christ

15th century 

 Adam lay ybounden
 The Cherry-Tree Carol
 Es kommt ein Schiff, geladen
 Ther is no rose of swych vertu

16th century 
 Der Morgenstern ist aufgedrungen
Es ist ein Ros entsprungen
 Nun komm, der Heiden Heiland
Of the Father's Heart Begotten
Tomorrow Shall Be My Dancing Day
 Wachet auf, ruft uns die Stimme

17th century 
 Conditor alme siderum
 Macht hoch die Tür
 Mit Ernst, o Menschenkinder
 O Heiland, reiß die Himmel auf
Rorate cæli (as a separate Advent hymn)
 
 Wie soll ich dich empfangen

18th century 
 Come, Thou Long Expected Jesus
Jesus Christ the Apple Tree
Lo! He comes with clouds descending
On Jordan's Bank the Baptist's Cry

19th century 
 Bereden väg för Herran
The Holly and the Ivy
 Hosianna, Davids son
Lasst uns froh und munter sein
Leise rieselt der Schnee
Macht weit die Pforten in der Welt
 Maria durch ein Dornwald ging
 Meine Seele, dank und singe
 Tochter Zion, freue dich

20th century 
 Advent är mörker och kyla
 Adventstid
 Det är advent
 
Kündet allen in der Not
Long Ago, Prophets Knew
Und unser lieben Frauen
Up, Awake, and Away! (Traditional Galician carol arranged by Philip Ledger)
 Vi tänder ett ljus i advent

Secular Advent songs 
 
 Leise rieselt der Schnee

Literature 
 Gerhard Engelsberger: Bilder vom Kommen Gottes. Dichter, Bilder und Botschaft der Adventslieder. Evangelischer Presseverband für Baden, Karlsruhe [1992], .

External links 
 

 
Lists of songs about a topic